Solar Energy is a peer-reviewed scientific journal and the official journal of the International Solar Energy Society. It covers research on all aspects of solar energy such as photovoltaics and solar heating, but also its indirect usages like wind power or bioenergy. According to the Journal Citation Reports, the journal has a 2021 impact factor of 7.188.

References

External links

Elsevier academic journals
Publications established in 1957
English-language journals
Energy and fuel journals
Solar energy